Justice M Sathyanarayanan (born 10 June 1959) is Former Judge of the Madras High Court. He was the third judge chosen to deliver the verdict in the Tamil Nadu MLA disqualification case.

Education
He studied B.Com at the DG Vaishnav College, in Chennai after which, he studied law at the Dr. Ambedkar Government Law College, Chennai.

Career in law
Justice Sathyanarayanan was enrolled as an advocate on 6 April 1983. He was a junior advocate under M N Padmanaban and K S Dinakaran.  He practiced on the civil as well as criminal side before the Madras High Court and lower courts. He also undertook service and tax matters, appearing for clients like All India Service Officers and Punjab National Bank. He also worked as the standing counsel for Punjab National Bank.

Judgeship
He was appointed was appointed as an Additional Judge of the Madras High Court on 23 April 2008 and as permanent Judge on 9 November 2009.

References

Judges of the Madras High Court
Judiciary of India
Living people
1959 births